Chamel or at times Shamel is a given name and a surname. It may refer to:

Chamel Roukoz, Lebanese Army brigadier general
Mohammad Chamel, Lebanese actor and screenwriter

See also
Lel Chamel, a 2010 Tunisian film directed by Youssef Chebbi.
Shamel
Shamil (disambiguation)